Central Bosnia is a central subregion of Bosnia, which consists of a core mountainous area with several basins, valleys and mountains. It is bordered by Bosnian Krajina to the northwest, Tropolje (Livno area) to the west, Herzegovina to the south, Sarajevo to the east and Tuzla to the northeast. It is a part of the Federation of Bosnia and Herzegovina and is divided between the Central Bosnia Canton and the Zenica-Doboj Canton, with a population of around 800,000. The largest city in the region is Zenica, with the Sarajevo-Zenica basin being the most densely populated area. Its highest peaks are Vranica (2,110 m), Šćit (1,780 m) and Bitovnja (1,700 m).

History 
The area was inhabited by Neolithic farmers during the First Agricultural Revolution. The first inhabitants of the region were the Kakanj, later replaced by the Neolithic Butmir culture. The largest Butmir site is in Okolište, near Visoko  At its height, with a population numbering between 1000 to 3000 inhabitants, Okolište is one of the largest Neolithic settlements in southeast Europe. Some of the first Indo-Europeans are thought to be members of eneolithic Vučedol culture which flourished between 3000 and 2200 BC.

The Iron Age saw the emergence of the Central Bosnian cultural group, with its significant site of Fortress Pod in Bugojno. This group is commonly associated with the later Illyrian tribe of Daesitiates, which dominated Central Bosnia until the arrival of Roman Empire, when the Illyrians were conquered by Roman Emperor Augustus. The Daesitiates were the first to revolt under the leadership of Bato the Daesitiate in the Great Illyrian revolt, which began in the spring of 6 AD. The role of the Daesitiates in the rebellion would be their demise, and after subsequent Romanization, they disappeared as a distinct group.

See also 
 Bosnia (region) 
 List of cities in Bosnia and Herzegovina
 Municipalities of Bosnia and Herzegovina
 Political divisions of Bosnia and Herzegovina

Notes

References

Sources 
 

Regions of Bosnia and Herzegovina
Bosnia (region)